Die Fledermaus is a 1946 German operetta film directed by Géza von Bolváry and starring Marte Harell, Johannes Heesters, and Will Dohm. It is based on Johann Strauss II's 1874 work of the same name.

The film was made by Terra Film, one of major German production companies of the Nazi era. It was shot using agfacolor at the Barrandov Studios in Prague and the Babelsberg Studios in Berlin. Although production began in 1944, the film was not finally released until 1946 when it was distributed by the communist-controlled DEFA company in the Soviet occupation zone.

The film's sets were designed by Robert Herlth.

Cast

See also
 Überläufer

References

Bibliography

External links 
 

1946 films
1940s historical musical films
German historical musical films
East German films
1940s German-language films
Films directed by Géza von Bolváry
Operetta films
Films based on operettas
Terra Film films
Films set in the 1890s
Films set in Vienna
Films shot at Barrandov Studios
Films shot at Babelsberg Studios
1940s German films